Asia Pacific Airlines may refer to:

Asia Pacific Airlines (United States), a cargo airline with its corporate headquarters in California and its flight operations based in Guam.
Asia Pacific Airlines (PNG), a passenger airline based in Papua New Guinea.
Association of Asia Pacific Airlines, a trade association of major Asia/Pacific airlines.